Glikmanius is an extinct genus of cladodont shark which lived in the Carboniferous of North America and Russia. The genus is based on a whole specimen from Nebraska, USA. Glikmanius is named in honour of the Russian palaeontologist, Dr. Leonid Glikman, who studied the genus and was "the first to propose its ctenacanthiform affinity".

Species
Glikmanius culmenis Koot, Cuny, Tintori & Twitchett, 2013
Glikmanius occidentalis Leidy, 1859
Glikmanius myachkovensis Lebedev, 2001

References

"Ctenacanthiform Cladodont Teeth from the Lower Permian Wichita Group, Texas, U.S.A.", Acta Geologica Polonica, Vol. 58 (2008), No. 2, pp. 205–209

Carboniferous sharks
Carboniferous fish of Europe
Carboniferous fish of North America
Prehistoric cartilaginous fish genera